This is a listing of the ministers who served in Busia's Progress Party government during the Second Republic of Ghana. The Second Republic lasted from 1 October 1969 to 13 January 1972.

List of ministers

Regional Chief Executives (Regional Ministers)

List of ministerial secretaries (Deputy Ministers)

See also
 Progress Party

References

External sources
The Statesman's Year-Book 1970-71; Editors: Paxton, J. (Ed.)

History of Ghana
Politics of Ghana
Governments of Ghana
1972 in Ghana
1969 establishments in Ghana
1972 disestablishments
Lists of government ministers of Ghana